Marc Dudicourt (6 May 1932 – 1 May 2021) was a French actor.

Biography
Son of an industrial designer, he came to live in Paris with his family when he was eleven years old. Passionate about Walt Disney and cartooning, he decided to become a designer and was hired by Jean Image in his drawing workshop. Then, pushed by his colleagues because of his fun side, he decided to take lessons at the Théâtre National Populaire and played in several plays, notably alongside Maria Casarès and Alain Cuny. After the T.N.P. he went to the Comédie de l'Est then to the Villeurbanne theater where he staged Nikolai Gogol]'s Dead Souls, he stayed there for six years, acknowledging that Roger Planchon had taught him everything.

He became known to the public for the television series Les nouvelles aventures de Vidocq in 1971, in the role of Flambart.

He was the co-founder of the ACE15 association (cultural and event association of the 15th arrondissement of Paris) which runs the Georges Brassens Days in October in Parc Georges-Brassens each year.

Dudicourt was also, with his friend Rémi Gidel, founder and president of the 1901 law association "La Vie en Chansons" which aims to defend French song and help young artists to become known.

Partial filmography

El Otro Cristóbal (1963) - Dictator Anastasio
A Matter of Resistance (1966) - Schimmelbeck (uncredited)
Made in U.S.A (1966) - Barman (uncredited)
King of Hearts (1966) - Lieutenant Hamburger
The Thief of Paris (1967) - Georges Antoine
Sheila in Bang Bang (1967) - Le notaire qui lit le testament (uncredited)
Soleil O (1967)
Very Happy Alexander (1968) - Monsieur Tondeur (uncredited)
La bande à Bonnot (1968) - Le commissaire
Les caprices de Marie (1970) - Le présentateur
Dossier prostitution (1970) - Le logeur
Ces messieurs de la gâchette (1970) - L'inspecteur
The Married Couple of the Year Two (1971) - Le chauve
Don't Deliver Us from Evil (1971) - L'aumônier
Boulevard du Rhum (1971) - Le metteur en scène
Gross Paris (1974)
Un nuage entre les dents (1974) - Garnier
Like a Pot of Strawberries (1974) - Le clochard
Serious as Pleasure (1975) - Le mercier
That Most Important Thing: Love (1975) - Mertolle (scenes deleted)
Soldat Duroc, ça va être ta fête! (1975) - L'adjudant Médeux
Incorrigible (1975) - Le gardien du ministère
L'exercice du pouvoir (1977)
Alors heureux? (1980) - Le maire (scenes deleted)
Jupiter's Thigh (1980) - Spiratos
Tête à claques (1982) - Directeur prison
Les malheurs d'Octavie (1983) - L'ambassadeur du Goulachistan
Le secret des sélénites (1983) - (voice)
Polar (1984) - Le Loup
Nuit d'ivresse (1986) - Le président Bulot
Frantic (1988) - Cafe Owner
À notre regrettable époux (1988) - Le curé
Sherazade (1990)
Justinien Trouvé, ou le bâtard de Dieu (1993) - Marquis Alix
Zadoc et le bonheur (1995) - Le curé
Les truffes (1995) - M'nsieur Martinez
Beaumarchais (1996) - Bartholo

References

1932 births
2021 deaths
French male actors
People from Amiens